Stefano Colagè (born 8 July 1962) is an Italian former professional road cyclist. He competed in eight editions of the Giro d'Italia, four editions of the Tour de France and one of the Vuelta a España. He also competed in the individual road race event at the 1984 Summer Olympics. His most notable victories were the 1995 Tirreno–Adriatico and the 1995 Gran Premio di Lugano.

Major results

1984
 3rd Overall Girobio
 3rd Overall Coors Classic
1985
 2nd Road race, National Road Championships
 2nd Giro del Veneto
 3rd Gran Premio Città di Camaiore
 3rd Milano–Vignola
1986
 1st Giro dell'Umbria
1987
 1st Memorial Nencini
 2nd GP Industria & Artigianato di Larciano
1988
 2nd Giro dell'Appennino
 2nd GP Industria & Artigianato di Larciano
 3rd Giro del Friuli
1989
 1st Giro dell'Umbria
 3rd Coppa Bernocchi
1990
 2nd Giro di Puglia
 2nd Giro di Campania
1991
 1st Stage 10 Tour de Suisse
 2nd Coppa Sabatini
1992
 1st Coppa Agostoni
 1st Stage 2 Tirreno–Adriatico
 1st Giro dell'Etna
 2nd Trofeo Pantalica
 2nd GP Industria & Artigianato di Larciano
1993
 1st Stage 1 Vuelta al Táchira
1994
 3rd Overall Tirreno–Adriatico
1995
 1st  Overall Tirreno–Adriatico
1st Stage 4
 1st Gran Premio di Lugano
 1st Giro dell'Etna
 1st Trofeo Pantalica
 3rd Coppa Sabatini
 3rd Tre Valli Varesine
1996
 1st Criterium d'Abruzzo
 3rd Giro di Puglia
1997
 3rd Criterium d'Abruzzo
 3rd Clásica de San Sebastián
1998
 1st Trofeo Pantalica
 3rd Giro del Piemonte

Grand Tour general classification results timeline

References

External links

1962 births
Living people
Italian male cyclists
Tour de Suisse stage winners
Cyclists at the 1984 Summer Olympics
Olympic cyclists of Italy
Sportspeople from the Province of Viterbo
Cyclists from Lazio